Mark Attard (born 29 July 1974) is a former Australian rules footballer who played for North Melbourne in the Australian Football League (AFL) in 1992. He was recruited from the Eastern Ranges in the TAC Cup with the 19th selection in the 1992 Mid-Season Draft.

References

External links

Living people
1974 births
North Melbourne Football Club players
Eastern Ranges players
Australian rules footballers from Victoria (Australia)